Blountstown is a city in Calhoun County, Florida, United States. It is the county seat of Calhoun County. As of the 2020 census, the city had a population of 2,266.

Name 
Blountstown is named for John Blount, a Creek Indian chief who served as a guide for General Andrew Jackson during his invasion of Spanish Florida in 1818.  This invasion was not directed at Spain, per se, but at Seminole Indians who would attack settlements north of Florida, then retreat to relative safety below the border of Spanish Florida.  Also, Spain did not return escaped slaves to the U.S.  In any case, this invasion caused Spain to sell Florida to the United States, since it was apparent that Spain would have a hard time defending against invasion.  Thus, this territory became a part of the U.S. in 1821.

History
Blountstown was originally named for a Seminole Chief (John Blount), who had been awarded land in the vicinity by Andrew Jackson for aiding Jackson in his battles against the Native Americans. However, he was forced to move from Florida to Texas in the 1830s. He died soon after being relocated. 

In the late 1850s, there was an open and violent feud between two rival factions which included the local Durden family. At one point, the Durdens and their rivals had a "pitched battle" at the courthouse square in Blountstown.  

On October 10, 2018, Blountstown was nearly annihilated when Category 5 Hurricane Michael struck the town. The city was without power for almost three weeks and over 80% of homes and businesses were heavily damaged or destroyed. Blountstown High School suffered heavy damage, but Blountstown Elementary School was completely destroyed. In addition, the local timber and farming industries, which are Calhoun County's largest industries, were completely destroyed, costing millions of dollars in economic loss.

Geography 

Directly to the east lies Bristol in Liberty County. Blountstown and Calhoun County uses the Central Time Zone, as opposed to Liberty County which is in the Eastern Time Zone.

Demographics

As of the 2020 census, Blountstown city had a population of 2,266 with 1,131 total households. There was a 47.0% employment rate and a median household income of $37,083. 28.6% of the population lived below the poverty threshold. The median age in the city was 38.0 years old.

Government
The old Calhoun County courthouse was located in Blountstown and is currently listed as a historic Florida landmark.

The city is home of the Calhoun Correctional Institution.

Education 
Calhoun County School District operates public schools.

Blountstown has three schools: Blountstown Elementary School, servicing kindergarten through fifth grades; Blountstown Middle School for sixth through eighth; and Blountstown High School for ninth through twelfth.

Notable people

 Patricia Dane, Hollywood actress of 1940s and early 1950s; starred in films Grand Central Murder, Johnny Eager and Life Begins for Andy Hardy; wife of bandleader Tommy Dorsey; died in Blountstown in 1995
 Corn Griffin, Heavyweight boxer born in Blountstown, whose memorable 1934 TKO loss to James J. Braddock was recreated for the 2005 film Cinderella Man
 Carey Loftin, Hollywood stuntman and actor, born in Blountstown
 Elam Stoltzfus, Suncoast Emmy award winning American environmental documentary filmmaker
 Fuller Warren, 30th governor of Florida

Images

References

External links 

 City of Blountstown, Florida
 The County Record newspaper that serves Blountstown, Florida is available in full-text with images in Florida Digital Newspaper Library

 
County seats in Florida
Cities in Calhoun County, Florida
Cities in Florida
1903 establishments in Florida
Populated places established in 1903